Archibald Thompson (5 August 1875 – 10 March 1950) was an Australian rules footballer who played for the Geelong Football Club in the Victorian Football League (VFL).

Notes

External links 

1875 births
1950 deaths
Australian rules footballers from Victoria (Australia)
Geelong Football Club (VFA) players
Geelong Football Club players
Newtown Football Club players